Stemm may refer to:
 STEMM, American metal band
 STEMM, abbreviation for Science, technology, engineering, mathematics, and medicine
 Stemm, Indiana, a community in the US

See also 
 Stem (disambiguation)
 Stemme, a German light aircraft manufacturer